Marceline Harvey (born 1938) is an American octogenarian serial killer from Brooklyn, New York City.

Early life
Marcelin was born in 1938 and was raised in New York City by a single mother. At the age of 14, he attempted to rape an 8-year-old girl and subsequently received counselling from Catholic Charities USA. He later found work as a copy machine operator.

Victims 
In early 1963, Harvey was accused of raping his girlfriend Jacqueline Bonds. At the time he reportedly "drank often, took cocaine, regularly assaulted Ms. Bonds and was in and out of psychiatric care". In April 1963, shortly before Harvey was due to appear before a grand jury on the rape charges, he shot and killed Bonds in their Manhattan apartment. A police report recorded that he "chased her as she staggered through the kitchen and living room, and shot her twice more before she collapsed". He was convicted of first-degree murder and sentenced to life in prison, but was released in 1984.

In October 1985, a year after his first release from prison, Harvey stabbed to death 29-year-old Ana Laura Sierra, a homeless heroin addict and sex worker. He then dismembered Ana's body and placed it in a dark plastic bag, which Harvey pushed around in a shopping cart before depositing it at an entrance to Central Park. He told police that Sierra had sold Harvey's flute to buy drugs. Harvey was again charged with first-degree murder, but struck a plea bargain and pleaded guilty to first-degree manslaughter. He was returned to prison in 1986, but was released in August 2019 after 15 parole hearings. Previously identified as male, he subsequently began identifying as a transgender woman and was placed in a women's homeless shelter in accordance with New York City Department of Social Services policy.

Harvey's alleged most recent victim is 68-year-old Susan Leyden, who was killed and dismembered in Marcelin's Brooklyn apartment in March 2022.

Personal life
At the time of the 2022 murder, Harvey identified as a transgender woman. However, during the 1963 and 1985 murders, he did not yet identify as a woman, and went by the name Harvey Marcelin.

In media 

 NBC New York TV report — The Timeline of Harvey Marcelin.

References 

1938 births
American serial killers
Living people
People convicted of murder by New York (state)
Prisoners sentenced to life imprisonment by New York (state)
Transgender women